Pervaiz may refer to:

Ansar Pervaiz, Pakistani nuclear scientist, nuclear technologist and the current chairman of the Pakistan Atomic Energy Commission
Chaudhry Pervaiz Elahi (born 1945), Pakistani politician
Dildar Pervaiz Bhatti (1946–1994), Pakistani television and radio host and announcer
Pervaiz Iqbal Cheema (born 1940), scholar of International Relations and Strategic Studies from Pakistan
Pervaiz Kaleem, Pakistani film director and writer based in Lahore
Raja Pervaiz Ashraf (born 1950), Prime Minister of Pakistan and Pakistan Peoples Party politician